General Sir Cecil Francis Romer,  (14 November 1869 – 1 October 1962) was a British Army general who reached high command during the 1920s.

Early life and education

Romer was born in Kensington, London, the son of Lord Justice Robert Romer (1840–1918) and Betty Lemon, daughter of Mark Lemon, editor of Punch. His elder brother was Mark Romer, Baron Romer (1866–1944). He was educated at Eton College. His sister, Helen Mary, married Lord Chancellor Frederic Maugham, 1st Viscount Maugham.

Military career
Romer was commissioned into the Royal Dublin Fusiliers as a second lieutenant on 1 March 1890, promoted lieutenant on 23 August 1893, and captain on 19 October 1898. He served in the Second Boer War between 1899 and 1902, and received the brevet rank of major on 29 November 1900. Following the war he was seconded as an adjutant of volunteers in February 1902, but only a few months later he was on 19 June 1902 appointed brigade major to the 13th Brigade, in Dublin. He went on to become a General Staff Officer in 1904.

In World War I, he fought on the Western Front. He was General Officer Commanding 59th (2nd North Midland) Division between 1917 and 1918.

He became General Officer Commanding 1st Division at Aldershot in 1926. He was then elevated to General Officer Commanding-in-Chief Western Command in 1928 and to General Officer Commanding-in-Chief Southern Command in 1931. In 1933, he was appointed Adjutant-General to the Forces: he retired in 1935.

References

External links
 

|-

|-
 

|-
 

|-
 

1869 births
1962 deaths
People from Kensington
People educated at Eton College
British Army generals of World War I
Knights Grand Cross of the Order of the Bath
Knights Commander of the Order of the British Empire
Companions of the Order of St Michael and St George
Royal Dublin Fusiliers officers
British Army personnel of the Second Boer War
Military personnel from London
British Army generals